Codine is a 1963 French-Romanian crime film directed by Henri Colpi. It was entered into the 1963 Cannes Film Festival where it won the award for Best Screenplay.

Cast
 Alexandru Virgil Platon as Codine
 Françoise Brion as Irène
 Nelly Borgeaud as Zoitza Zograffi
 Maurice Sarfati as Alexis
 Răzvan Petrescu as Adrian Zograffi (as Razvan Petresco)
 Germaine Kerjean as Anastasia
 Graziela Albini
 
 Nicolae Bodescu
  (as Dorine Dron)
 Mihai Fotino as Cotoiul
  as Catrina
  as Anton

References

External links

1963 films
1963 crime films
Romanian crime films
1960s French-language films
Films directed by Henri Colpi
French crime films
1960s French films